Lévi Kahamba Ntumba (born 12 January 2001) is a French professional footballer who plays as a goalkeeper for Grasshopper in the Swiss Super League.

Professional career
Ntumba has made 27 appearances for the reserve team of Dijon FCO between 2018 and 2021 in the Championnat National 3. He chose not to renew his contract in summer 2021.

On 7 January 2022, he signed with Grasshopper Club Zürich, as their third goalkeeper. In the 2021-22 season, he made seven appearances for the reserve team in the First League.

Personal life
Born in Paris, France, he is of Congolese descent.

References

External links
 
 SFL Profile

2001 births
Living people
German footballers
Grasshopper Club Zürich players
Swiss Super League players
Association football midfielders